Scott David Malkin (born 1959) is the founder of Value Retail Plc and co-owner of the New York Islanders professional hockey team.

Early life and education
Malkin was born to a Jewish family, the son of Isabel (née Wien) and Peter L. Malkin. His father is a real estate investor in New York who owned the Empire State Building. His grandfather, Lawrence Wien, was also a real estate investor who pioneered the real estate syndication. He was raised in Connecticut and received degrees from Harvard College, Harvard Law School and Harvard Business School.

Career
In 1990, Malkin sold his retail store concept, 2 Rodeo Drive in Beverly Hills, California to the Japanese department store operator Sogo and then moved to London where in 1992, he founded Value Retail Plc. With Value Retail, he leveraged his experience in selling luxury goods and meshed it with the American outlet mall concept creating an alternative operating model to the traditional European shopping center. Value Retail focused on establishing outlet centers in the outskirts of large cities. The fashion brands pay 12.5 per cent of annual turnover for the privilege of selling excess stock in one of their village outlet centers. Although criticized for taking business from smaller retail stores in urban centers, the outlet centers only sell brand name goods that are a year old or older.

As of 2014, Value Retail had nine "villages" in Europe near London, Milan, Munich, Dublin, Barcelona, Madrid, Paris, Brussels, Antwerp, Cologne, Düsseldorf, and Frankfurt. He is expanding to China in 2015 with two new villages in Suzhou and Shanghai. By 2011, Value Retail had $1.5 billion in sales.

New York Islanders
In October 2014, it was announced that Malkin and his former college roommate Jon Ledecky would purchase the New York Islanders professional hockey team from Charles Wang. After a two-year transition period as minority owners, Malkin and Ledecky bought controlling interest in 2016.

Personal life
In 1984, he married Laura Rice Russell. His sister, Cynthia Allison Malkin, is married to Richard Blumenthal who was elected as a United States senator of Connecticut in 2011.

References

External links
Value Retail

1959 births
American real estate businesspeople
New York (state) lawyers
Harvard Law School alumni
Businesspeople from New York City
Jewish American sportspeople
New York Islanders executives
Living people
Harvard Business School alumni
Carnegie Endowment for International Peace
Wien family
21st-century American Jews
Harvard College alumni